Heath Franklin (born 23 December 1980) is an Australian comedic performer, improviser and writer.

Career
He appeared on The Ronnie Johns Half Hour sketch comedy show, ABC TV's Spicks and Specks, Working Dog's Thank God You're Here and in New Zealand, on 7 Days. He also appeared in the show Randling with the teammate: Felicity Ward. Heath is in the team: Ducks of war.

He is best known for his impersonation of the infamous Australian criminal Mark Brandon "Chopper" Read.

In 2010, Franklin starred in the New Zealand crime comedy, Predicament.

Career appearances

TV appearances

As 'stage persona', "Chopper Read"

 Network Ten The Christmas Panel special (2006)
 The Comedy Channel's Stand Up Australia (2007).
 The Comedy Channel's Cracker Festival Gala (2008)
 C4's Jono's New Show, New Zealand (2009)
 The Comedy Channel's Sydney Comedy Festival Gala, (2009)
 Network 10's 9am with David & Kim (2009)
 The Comedy Channel's Make Deadshits History - Pentridge Interstituals (2009)
 ABC's Spicks and Specks Xmas Special - "A Very Specky Christmas" (2009)
 TV3's Aotearoha-ha Christmas Comedy Gala (NZ) (2009)
 The Comedy Channel's Sydney Comedy Festival Cracker Gala (2010–11)
 TV3's New Zealand Comedy Festival Gala (2010 and 2011)
 C4's Jono's New Show, New Zealand (2012)
 TV3's 7 Days (NZ) (2009–present, Recurring Panelist)
 10's Chopper's Republic Of Anzakistan, Australia (2016, Live Show with skits added for TV)

As himself
 The Ronnie Johns Half Hour, (2005–06) writer; performer
 Network 10's 9am with David & Kim (2008)
 ABC's Spicks and Specks (2008, two episodes)
 ABC's Spicks and Specks "A Very Specky Christmas" 2008 Christmas special (2008)
 Network 10/Roving Enterprises' The 7pm Project (2009)
 Channel Seven/Working Dog's Thank God You're Here (2009)
 C4's Wanna-Ben (NZ) (2012)
 ABC's Randling (2012, 6 episodes)

As both
 Network 10/Southern Star's The Spearman Experiment (2009)
 Review with Myles Barlow (2010)

Film appearances
 Predicament, a 2010 film (directed by Jason Stutter) − Mervyn Toebuck

Radio appearances
Triple M Merrick & Australia (2015-)

Awards and nominations
In 2006, Franklin was nominated for the Inaugural Graham Kennedy Logie Award for "Most Outstanding New Talent" regarding his work on The Ronnie Johns Half Hour. He also performed warm-up duties for the Logies.

ARIA Music Awards
The ARIA Music Awards are a set of annual ceremonies presented by Australian Recording Industry Association (ARIA), which recognise excellence, innovation, and achievement across all genres of the music of Australia. They commenced in 1987. 

! 
|-
| ARIA Music Awards of 2010 || Heath Franklin's Chopper: Make Deadsh*ts History || ARIA Award for Best Comedy Release ||  || 
|-

References

External links
 

1980 births
Living people
Australian male comedians
Comedians from Sydney
Australian male television actors
Male actors from Sydney